Samia A. Halaby (born 1936, in Jerusalem) is a Palestinian artist, activist, and scholar living and working in New York. Halaby is recognized as a pioneer of abstract painting. Since beginning her artistic career in the late 1950s, she has exhibited in museums, galleries, and art fairs throughout Europe, Asia, North and South America. Her work is housed in public and private collections around the world, including the Solomon R. Guggenheim Museum (New York), the Institut du Monde Arabe (Paris), and the Palestinian Museum (Birzeit).

She received her academic training in the U.S., Halaby and has been active in American academia, teaching art at the university level for over twenty years, a decade of which was spent as an associate professor at Yale School of Art (1972–82) She was the first woman to hold the position of Associate Professor at the Yale School of Art. She also taught at the University of Hawaii, Indiana University, the Cooper Union, the University of Michigan, and the Kansas City Art Institute.

Based in New York since the 1970s, Halaby has long been active in the city's art scene, mainly through independent and non-profit art spaces and artist-run initiatives, in addition, she participated in leftist political organizing for various causes. She has long been an activist for working-class and Palestinian liberation movements.

Early life

Halaby was born in Jerusalem in 1936 during the British Mandate of Palestine. She is the daughter of Asaad Halaby and Foutonie Atallah Halaby. Samia has two older brothers, Dr. Sami and Dr. Fouad Halaby, and a younger sister, Dr. Nahida Halaby. Their father was orphaned and, at a young age, had the financial responsibility of supporting his siblings thrust upon him. He began the first taxi service in Jerusalem in the early 1900s, eventually becoming a Principal of Lind & Halaby Ltd., a seller of Goodyear Tire and Rubber Company. Their mother was educated at the Friends School in Ramallah. She was referred to as “the encyclopedia of the family.”

Halaby retains vivid visual memories of her life in Palestine, especially of the trees and leaves in her grandmother Maryam Atallah's garden in Jerusalem. As a young child Samia would experience synesthetic colors and shapes that would correlate with various family members. Her sister was a rounded and yellow/white iridescent Samia was dark metallic red sideways railroad. In 1948, Halaby and her family fled their home in the port city of Yafa (Jaffa) in 1948 with the creation of the Israeli state. She was eleven years old. Her family fled to Lebanon, where they resided in Beirut until 1951, when they eventually settled in Cincinnati, Ohio.

Painting Style
Halaby primarily works in abstraction but has also utilized a documentary-style of figurative drawing in more politically oriented works, namely her Kafr Qasm series. She has  designed dozens of political posters and banners for various anti-war causes and is featured in the publication "The Design of Dissent". The development of her work over the past fifty years has been closely related to locating the many principles of abstraction in nature utilizing a materialist approach. A number of her paintings have been created by building upon the methods and forms of certain historical applications of abstraction, namely that of the Russian Constructivists and examples of traditional Arabic arts and Islamic architecture. The visual culture of Palestine and its natural setting have also figured into her paintings, as has the dynamism of New York City as experienced in the sights of people in motion and its busy streets 

Her approach to abstraction has ranged from works exploring the visual properties of the geometric still life to free-form paintings in the form of collaged pieces of canvas that are joined to create larger abstractions that are free from the stretch. As of 2020, her oeuvre contained over 3,000 works, including paintings, digital media, three-dimensional hanging sculptures, artist books, drawings, and limited edition artist prints.

After retiring from teaching, Halaby began experimenting with electronic art forms, teaching herself how to program Basic and C programming languages on an Amiga computer and later on a PC. Creating programs that would allow viewers to witness the process of live computerized painting, she enlisted the help of musicians for kinetic art performances that were inspired by jam sessions. Her "Kinetic Painting Group" toured extensively in the late 1990s.

Abstract Color (1963-1965) 

During her final student days and for a period after, Halaby's approach to painting was characterized by flat color where relationships of luminosity and simultaneous contrast were inspired by the Minimalists and by work of Josef Albers and his book "Interaction of Color." In terms of shape, the work depended essentially on the rectangular surfaces of human life be they walls, windows, writing paper, floors, cards, or gently hung weavings. The variety of scale and placement was clearly an abstraction from ways of examining the world we see. During that short span, Halaby left Bloomington to teach in Honolulu at the University of Hawaii, then moved to Kansas City for her second teaching position at the Kansas City Art Institute.

Geometric Still-Life (1966 - 1970) 
After 1965, a scientific attitude of exactly how we observe and interpret what we see overtook her. She writes, “I began to feel that I must make a clean, new beginning and erase my teachers and my past out of my thoughts.” At this point, Halaby relied on what she saw at museums and her knowledge of art history to develop her new way of thinking. She would examine Rembrandt, his use of light and color in portraiture and was particularly impressed with the Old Master collection at the Kansas City Museum. After an extended and frustrating exploration, a small orange on a windowsill first captured Halaby's attention and started the new series. This inspiration can be attributed to the painting “Virgin and Child in Domestic Interior” (ca. 1469–67) by Flemish master Petrus Christus in the collection of the Nelson-Atkins Gallery of Art in Kansas City. Halaby was then teaching at the Kansas City Art Institute and leading a boldly experimental program for first-year students. 

As she describes her interest in later writing, Halaby tells of revisiting the museum to examine how artists historically treated edges. From her thorough education at the University of Cincinnati, Halaby understood the failures of perspective. She wanted to know exactly what it is we see when our eye travels over the surface of a spherical or cylindrical object, reaches the edge and then jumps to a far background. Finding no answers, Halaby realized that how we see is educated. Over millennia artists have contributed the multitude of small discoveries that created the monument of visual culture that teaches us how to see. This then became, to Halaby, the important challenge as she insisted that painting is exploration not performance.

Helixes and Cycloids (1971 - 1975) 

As the Geometric Still Life series had satisfied her curiosity, Halaby found herself at a critical point on her artistic path. She felt that she could explore one of two directions, either focus on the individual and the self or life outside. She tested the first direction by doing a portrait of a friend but quickly decided to embrace the latter. She interpreted the idea of life outside the self as painting that expands its content outside the frame. 

As a point of reference, the artist had purchased several used books on geometry, with some devoted to pipe fitting. A book that showed how to cut flat shapes that make complex three dimensional pipe fittings lead her to fascination in plotting helical and later cycloid curves. Halaby would plot these curves on large sheets of graph paper and then would select sections to paint.

While in the midst of the helical series, Halaby was hired at Yale University on the tenure track. She moved to New Haven, Connecticut, and rented a studio she in the downtown area where she complete her “Helical and Cycloid” series.

Diagonal Flight (1974 - 1979) 

While teaching at the Yale School of Art, Halaby worked on the new Diagonal Flight series. The title had occurred to her while watching children play with arms outstretched while running, making engine sounds, pretending to be airplanes. She had been wondering to which direction the diagonal horizons of her new paintings should lean. The children, being mostly right handed, banked their pretend flight to the right. She determined immediately to follow their natural habits.

Although still cognizant of the commitment to pursue the idea of conjugation emanating from the geometric still lifes, Halaby was testing the irrationality of perspective and shading by creating an accurately shaded space that we cannot read according to our educated skills. How would viewers see a carefully shaded cylinder if it extended outside the perimeter of the painting on both ends? The information on the depth of the cylinder would be so concretely provided by the circular ends and would not be visible. The result was that scale became relative and the space of the paintings could easily be read as variedly colored horizons such as one might see out of the window of an airplane. Geometry and the convergence of measurements continued to dominate her thoughts.

Dome of the Rock (1980 - 1982) 

In 1979, Halaby felt that she had reached the end of the Diagonal Flight series. Instead of experimenting with new directions, she stopped painting entirely for a short period then painted profusely, most of which she ultimately destroyed. It was an important pivotal moment where she shifted into the second broad phase of her artistic life, that of abstraction. In essence, Halaby explains, it was essentially a continuation of seeing but with the addition of the fourth dimension of time.

Finally, the Dome of the Rock series was inspired by a visit to Jerusalem in 1966. Forty-five degree diagonal lines emanate from the corners while points of diamonds began and ended at measured locations on the perimeter. Here, she added cylinders and textures inspired by inlaid Arabic art.

Autumn Leaves and City Blocks (1982 - 1983) 

Another short series based on investigations the artist did many years earlier is Autumn Leaves and City Blocks. Her focus on the cells between veins in autumn leaves and their similarity to city blocks that she knew in New York connected together formed basis for this series. At that time Halaby lived in New York and commuted to New Haven while teaching at the Yale School of Art.

Halaby noticed that human building was dominated by the right angle but that in the growth of highways and city blocks those right-angled rectangles were often disturbed and thus truncated by the necessities imposed by natural land formations. They resembled the cells between veins in a maple leaf. The ways in which bridges crossed rivers, at right angles then bend according to land formation also formed a part of the inspiration. Halaby determined that her paintings, to be as beautiful as nature, had to grow according to principles extracted from nature. Thus what is unique in this series is that it is based on the process of growth she observed in nature.

Growing Shapes and Centers of Energy (1984 - 1992) 

Ideas regarding imitating principles of growth dominated her creativity during the 1980s. She began to allow lines and shapes to actively change each other. A shape that is intersected by a line might divide itself into two. A line that received a shape may mirror itself in the shape's outline. Color and composition as well as the paintings perimeter all participated in this process of growth 
Halaby was beginning to find her way through a new way of seeing and a new way of making abstract paintings, one that imitates the principles of nature not its appearance. Her work became more apparent in freely moving gestures and her more generally more intuitive in execution while her ideas remained strongly structures.

Kinetic Painting (1983 - 1995) 
Having been fascinated by computing since her days as a graduate student at Indiana University, Halaby began to focus on the relationship of art to the technology of its time. She acquired a small personal computer, an Amiga, and found programming painting in motion with sound a hugely beautiful and absorbing project. “I could put in my paintings a more complete impression of what I see and hear of my experiences of life.”

Halaby learnt to program and created her kinetic paintings by programming not by using animation software. Her digital paintings were created with the same aesthetic intent as oil and acrylic ones. Instead of adding paint to canvas then walking back to examine her work, she would add program commands, compile the program, then run it to judge its worth.

Painterly Abstraction (1991 - 2000) 

Early in 1990, Halaby took a long look at all she has done and concluded that it was time create space in the painting relying only on brush marks as the building blocks of the painting. Early in the 1980s, she had removed shading and perspective and now she removed shape. Allowing only the distribution of brush marks in different size and color to create the space without reference to imagery was both hard and generative.

New references to how we see began to emerge. Halaby often talked about how our eyes shift focus from place to place while we walk and examine our surroundings. Thus how we look and not what we look at became the subject of the painting. As viewers see distribution of brush marks in a painting, they recognize their own habits of looking at the world and in ways that are not wholly clear, an experience of relative space in an abstract painting emerges.

Free of the Stretcher (2000 - 2008) 
Over a long and fertile career, Samia Halaby has always kept the picture plane and its perimeter in focus as a primary compositional player. She now begins to contemplate its removal. The result was a series of works free of the stretcher. Previously painted pieces of canvas were cut and reformed through stitching. Paint was applied before and after cutting and to both sides of the canvas fragments.  The separate pieces were often treated like paintings in their own right. While aggregating the pieces she often felt inspired by the beauty of how leaves build to make magnificent trees.

Hanging Gardens 

Hanging Gardens grew from Halaby's ‘free of the stretcher’ painting where Halaby would cut parts of painted canvas and recombine them. Here, a need to collage the parts led to stitching them. Methods of attaching consecutive parts led to sensations of tree leaves and branches grew. “I was so deeply immersed in these aesthetic exploration feeling as though I was making trees that I had not noticed that the most important principle of growing trees is contradicted by my hanging soft stitchery. Thus the idea of hanging gardens suggested itself.”

Intuitive Search (2008 - onwards) 
Beginning with her relationship with Ayyam, Halaby began to rely on her intuitions attempting to exploit the whole of her experience without demanding that growth be a known process or planned exploration. Echoes of all that she had learnt on a long journey appeared in canvases larger than she had done earlier. This most recent period includes at least ten mural sized works. It is a rich outpouring in pure abstract form that taps into the beauty of nature and of mankind's building.

Digital Work 
After retiring from teaching, Halaby began experimenting with electronic art forms during the 1980s, teaching herself how to program Basic and C programming languages on an Amiga 2000 computer. The results were short programs that ran on their own with abstract images in motion and with sound that she called kinetic paintings.

A few years later during the early 1990s Halaby began programing on a PC converting the keyboard into an abstract painting piano. This program was also called Kinetic Painting and was not published but remained the artist's private tool. She used it to perform live with musicians. Multi-percussion musician, Kevin Nathaniel Hylton became her main collaborator as she begun the public performance process utilizing her program. With musician Hasan Bakr they formed the Kinetic Painting Group and performed at numerous off-Broadway venues often accompanied by other musicians.

Notable performances of the Kinetic Painting Group include 

 Third and Fourth International Symposiums on Electronic Art (1993, 1994) Minneapolis, MN
 Brooklyn Museum of Art (1994)
 Philadelphia College of Art (1997)
 Galerie Le Pont (1997), Aleppo, Syria
 Atassi Gallery (1997), Damascus, Syria
 Sakakini Art Center (1997) Sakakini Art Center, Ramallah, West Bank
 BeirZeit University (1997), BeirZeit, West Bank
 Darat al Funun (1997), Amman, Jordan
 Lebanese American University (1998), Beirut, Lebanon
 Lincoln Center (1998)
 Williamsburg Art and Historical Center (1998) Brooklyn, New York

References in Visual Culture
Due to her recognition in both the contemporary Arab art scene and in the US-based activist community, Halaby has been the subject of a number of art works by other artists. The 2008 film "Samia" by Syrian filmmaker and conceptual artist Ammar Al Beik was created around a taped interview of the artist, Al Beik includes Halaby's own footage of a trip to the West Bank in which she narrates her stay there and later documents a trip to her grandmother's apartment in Jerusalem. This is interwoven with Al Beik's own sequences exploring the modern Palestinian condition. In 2011, the Palestinian conceptual artist Khalil Rabah included a portrait of Halaby for his large-scale project of "ready mades" that stood as a "subjective" overview of contemporary Palestinian art history. Rabah's portrait is based on a photograph from the artist's archive that was taken at one of her first exhibitions in the 1960s.

Scholarship on Palestinian Art

As an independent scholar she has contributed to the documentation of Palestinian art of the twentieth century through such texts as her 2001 book, "Liberation Art of Palestine: Palestinian Painting and Sculpture in the Second Half of the 20th Century" (H.T.T.B. Publications), a chapter titled "“The Pictorial Arts of Jerusalem During the First Half of the 20th Century,” that appears in the 2012 book, Jerusalem Interrupted: Modernity and Colonial Transformation 1917-Present (ed. Lena Jayyusi, Olive Branch Press) and several curated exhibitions of Palestinian art in the US. She has also lectured widely on the subject in galleries and universities throughout the US and in venues in the Arab world.

In the early 2000s, she was instrumental in the landmark exhibition "Made in Palestine," which was organized by the Station Museum of Contemporary Art in Houston and curated by James Harithas, Tex Kerschen, and Gabriel Delgado. Halaby actively assisted the curators in researching Palestinian artists, both in the US and the Arab world, introducing them to such artists as the late Mustapha Hallaj in Syria and Abdul Hay al Mussalam in Jordan, for example. The first museum exhibition of Palestinian art to be held in the US, "Made in Palestine" (2003) went on to tour the US,

The 2004 exhibition "The Subject of Palestine," which Halaby curated for the DePaul Art Museum, was described by the Chicago Tribune as presenting "the work of 16 contemporary Palestinian artists that even the least informed of viewers are likely to come away with the sense that they have seen and grasped something important." The review went on to congratulate DePaul Art Museum for its "incisive presentation.

Public collections (partial list)
The British Museum
The Guggenheim Museum (New York and Abu Dhabi)
The Art Institute of Chicago
Detroit Institute of Art
The Cleveland Museum of Art
Cincinnati Art Museum
Indianapolis Museum of Art
The National Museum of Women in the Arts
Mead Art Museum
Arab World Institute
Mathaf: Arab Museum of Modern Art
Eskenazi Museum of Art, Indiana University

Exhibitions of Palestinian Art
"Art of Palestine" (2005) Zeitgeist Gallery, Cambridge, MA (curator)
"The Subject of Palestine" (2004) Depaul Art Museum, Chicago, IL (curator) (which later traveled to the Jerusalem Fund Gallery in Washington DC in 2005)
"Palestine: Art of Resistance" (2003) Tribes Gallery, Manhattan, NY (co-curator with Zena El-Khalil and Janine Al-Janabi)
"Williamsburg Bridges Palestine" (2002) Williamsburg Art & Historical Center, Brooklyn, NY (co-curator with Zena El-Khalil)
"Palestinian Art" (2001) Headquarters of Union DC 1707, Manhattan, NY (curator)

Performances and Presentations of Kinetic Painting
Third and Fourth International Symposiums on Electronic Art (1993, 1994) Minneapolis, MN
Brooklyn Museum of Art (1994)
Philadelphia College of Art (1997)
Galerie Le Pont (1997), Aleppo, Syria
Atassi Gallery (1997), Damascus, Syria
Sakakini Art Center (1997) Sakakini Art Center, Ramallah, West Bank
Beirzeit University (1997), BeirZeit, West Bank
Darat al Funun (1997), Amman, Jordan
Lebanese American University (1998), Beirut, Lebanon
Lincoln Center (1998)
Williamsburg Art and Historical Center (1998) Brooklyn, New York

References

External links 
Website of the artist
Samia Halaby: artist profile from the Station Museum's Made in Palestine exhibition
Website of Ayyam gallery, Samia Halaby's commercial representative
Birzeit University Online Library
Samia Halaby speaking on Self-Censorship internet video made in conjunction with the National Coalition Against Censorship and the Vera List Center for Art and Politics at the New School
Interview with Samia Halaby as part of a series of Q & A with contemporary Arab artists on ArteNews

Michigan State University faculty
Palestinian artists
Palestinian emigrants to Lebanon
Yale School of Art faculty